Ambassador Hotel may refer to:

United States
Ambassador Hotel (Los Angeles), California
Ambassador Hotel (Jacksonville), Florida
Ambassador Hotel (San Francisco), California
Ambassador Hotel (Atlantic City), New Jersey, converted to the Tropicana Casino and Resort in 1981
Ambassador Hotel (Tulsa, Oklahoma)
Ambassador East, Chicago, Illinois
Ambassador West, Chicago, Illinois
Ambassador Hotel Historic District, listed on the National Register of Historic Places for Kansas City, Missouri

Other places
Ambasador Hotel, Niš, Serbia
Ambassador Hotel Hsinchu, Taiwan
Ambassador Hotel Kaohsiung, Taiwan

See also
Hotel Ambasadori, Tbilisi, Georgia